Manuel Mariaca (born January 4, 1986, in Cuernavaca, Morelos), is a former Mexican footballer. He last played for Cruz Azul Hidalgo as a defender in Mexico's Primera Division.

See also
List of people from Morelos, Mexico

References

External links

1986 births
Living people
Association football defenders
Cruz Azul footballers
Lobos BUAP footballers
Footballers from Morelos
Sportspeople from Cuernavaca
Mexican footballers